Manic Nirvana is the fifth studio album by former Led Zeppelin singer Robert Plant, released 19 March 1990 on Es Paranza Records, Plant's own label. The lead single, "Big Love", reached #35 on the Mainstream Rock Tracks chart, and its follow-up, "Hurting Kind (I've Got My Eyes on You)", held #1 on the same chart for six consecutive weeks.
 
The vinyl release had 10 songs (five per side) rather than 11, omitting "She Said".

"It has the savvy and emotional strength you'd expect from an adult," enthused Entertainment Weekly.

ReissuesManic Nirvana'' was remastered and reissued by Rhino Records on 20 March 2007, this edition included 3 bonus tracks which were taken from the 1990 European CD single release of "Hurting Kind (I've Got My Eyes on You)".

Track listing

Personnel

Chris Blackwell – drums, guitars
Doug Boyle – lead guitar
Phil Johnstone – keyboards, guitars
Charlie Jones – bass
Robert Plant – vocals

Additional musicians

Laila Cohen – vocals
Micky Groome – vocals on "Big Love"
Caroline Harding – vocals
Siddi Makain Mushkin – voices on "Watching You"
Bob Stride – vocals on "Big Love"

Production

Darren Allison – assistant engineer
Michael Butterworth – assistant engineer
Phil Johnstone – producer
Robert Plant – producer
Bill Price – mixing on "Hurting Kind (I've Got My Eyes on You)" & "Big Love"
Mark "Spike" Stent – co-producer, engineer
Jeremy Wheatley – assistant engineer

Charts

Weekly charts

Year-end charts

Certifications

References

1990 albums
Robert Plant albums